Alfred Fischer may refer to:

Alfred Fischer (architect) (1881–1950), German architect
Alfred Fischer (judge) (1919–2004), German judge
Alfred Fischer (botanist) (1858–1913), German botanist
Alfred Fischer (rower) (born 1960), Swiss Olympic rower
Alfred Fischer (SS officer) (1907–1945), German Waffen-SS officer
Alfred G. Fischer (1920–2017), German-American geologist

See also
Alfred Fisher, English rugby league footballer in the 1940s and 1950s